The 2019–20 season was Burton Albion's 70th season in their history and their third in League One. Along with competing in the League One, the club also participated in the FA Cup, League Cup and League Trophy. The season ran from 1 July 2019 to 30 June 2020.

Squad

Statistics

|-
!colspan=14|Players who left the club:

|}

Goals record

Disciplinary record

Transfers

Transfers in

Loans in

Loans out

Transfers out

Pre-season
The Brewers confirmed their pre-season schedule in June 2019.

Competitions

EFL League One

League table

Results summary

Results by matchday

Matches
On Thursday, 20 June 2019, the EFL League One fixtures were revealed.

FA Cup

The first round draw was made on 21 October 2019. The second round draw was made live on 11 November from Chichester City's stadium, Oaklands Park. The third round draw was made live on BBC Two from Etihad Stadium, Micah Richards and Tony Adams conducted the draw.

EFL Cup

The first round draw was made on 20 June. The second round draw was made on 13 August 2019 following the conclusion of all but one first round matches. The third round draw was confirmed on 28 August 2019, live on Sky Sports. The draw for the fourth round was made on 25 September 2019.

EFL Trophy

On 9 July 2019, the pre-determined group stage draw was announced with Invited clubs to be drawn on 12 July 2019.

References

Burton Albion F.C. seasons
Burton Albion